The Hohstock ( high) is a mountain of the Bernese Alps, located north of Belalp in the Swiss canton of Valais. It lies on the range east of the Unterbächhorn, between the valley of the Oberaletsch Glacier and the cirque of Belalp.

In winter the Hohstock is part of a ski area. A  tunnel connects it to the slopes on the southwestern side.

References

External links
 Hohstock on Hikr

Mountains of the Alps
Bernese Alps
Alpine three-thousanders
Mountains of Valais
Mountains of Switzerland